Anco is an unincorporated community in Knott County, Kentucky, United States.

References

Unincorporated communities in Knott County, Kentucky
Unincorporated communities in Kentucky
Coal towns in Kentucky